Fanny Estelle Posvite  (born 27 May 1992) is a French judoka. 

She won a bronze medal at the 2015 World Judo Championships in Astana.

References

External links
 
 
 

1992 births
Living people
French female judoka
Mediterranean Games gold medalists for France
Mediterranean Games medalists in judo
Competitors at the 2013 Mediterranean Games
Universiade bronze medalists for France
Universiade medalists in judo
People from Limoges
21st-century French women